Edward C. Lumley,  (born October 27, 1939) is a Canadian corporate executive and former politician.

Born in Windsor, Ontario, he received a Bachelor of Commerce degree in 1961 from Assumption University (predecessor of the University of Windsor). Lumley established himself in business in Cornwall in the other end of the province before entering politics.  He served as Mayor of Cornwall between 1972 and 1974, and was first elected to the House of Commons of Canada as the Liberal Member of Parliament for Stormont—Dundas in the 1974 federal election.

In 1976, Lumley became parliamentary secretary to the Minister of Regional Economic Expansion. From 1977 to 1978, he served as parliamentary secretary to the Minister of Finance.

Lumley survived the 1979 election that defeated the Liberal government. The Liberals returned to power in the 1980 federal election and Prime Minister Pierre Trudeau appointed Lumley to the cabinet as Minister of State for Trade. After serving in a few other minor portfolios, he was promoted to Minister of Industry and Minister of Regional Economic Expansion in 1982.

Trudeau's successor, John Turner, made Lumley his Minister of Communications and Minister of Regional Industrial Expansion in 1984.  Lumley was defeated in the 1984 federal election that fall.

Following his electoral defeat, Lumley returned to the private sector and became an influential corporate figure. He has served as vice-chairman of BMO Nesbitt Burns since 1991, lead director of Magna International, and a board member of Bell Canada Enterprises, Canadian National Railway and Air Canada.

In 2000, he was appointed to lead a commission examining salaries and compensation for Members of Parliament.

A friend of the former prime minister, Paul Martin, he had been consulted by Martin's government on various issues.

In 2006, he was appointed Chancellor of the University of Windsor.

On July 1, 2014, he was appointed as a member of the Order of Canada.

References

 

1939 births
People of Bell Canada
Canadian university and college chancellors
Liberal Party of Canada MPs
Living people
Members of the King's Privy Council for Canada
Members of the House of Commons of Canada from Ontario
Members of the United Church of Canada
Politicians from Windsor, Ontario
Canadian corporate directors
Members of the Order of Canada
Members of the 23rd Canadian Ministry